In the occipital bone, the lower division of the cruciate eminence is prominent, and is named the internal occipital crest; it bifurcates near the foramen magnum and gives attachment to the falx cerebelli; in the attached margin of this falx is the occipital sinus, which is sometimes duplicated.

In the upper part of the internal occipital crest, a small depression is sometimes distinguishable; it is termed the vermian fossa since it is occupied by part of the cerebellar vermis of the cerebellum.

Additional images

References

External links

 

Bones of the head and neck